Pietro Damini (1592–1631) was an Italian painter of the late-Renaissance period. He was born in Castelfranco Veneto and active in Venice.

He was the pupil of the painter Giovanni Battista Novelli. He painted Christ giving keys to Peter for San Clemente in Padua. He painted a Crucifixion for the Basilica of St Anthony in Padua.  He also painted an image of Saint Prosdocimus.

References

1592 births
1631 deaths
16th-century Italian painters
Italian male painters
17th-century Italian painters
Painters from Padua
Painters from Venice
Italian Renaissance painters